The 1996 FIVB Volleyball World League was the seventh edition of the annual men's international volleyball tournament, played by 11 countries from 10 May to 29 June 1996. The Final Round was held in Rotterdam, Netherlands.

Pools composition

Intercontinental round

Pool A

|}

|}

Pool B

|}

|}

Pool C

|}

|}

Final round
Venue:  Rotterdam Ahoy, Rotterdam, Netherlands

Pool play
Teams from the same pool of Intercontinental Round will not play.

|}

|}

Finals

3rd place match

|}

Final

|}

Final standing

Awards
 Most Valuable Player
  Lorenzo Bernardi
 Best Scorer
  Lorenzo Bernardi
 Best Spiker
  Stanislav Dineykin
 Best Server
  Alain Roca
 Best Blocker
  Ihosvany Hernández

External links
 1996 World League results
 Sports123

1996
FIVB World League
Volleyball
1996 in Dutch sport